Ildar Khaydarovich Shabayev (born 28 April 1985) is a Russian former professional football player.

Club career
He played 10 seasons in the Russian Football National League for 6 different teams.

Personal life
His brother Nail Shabayev is also a professional footballer.

External links
 
 

1985 births
Sportspeople from Samara, Russia
Living people
Russian footballers
Association football defenders
FC Rostov players
FC Mordovia Saransk players
FC Vityaz Podolsk players
FC Yenisey Krasnoyarsk players
FC Tyumen players
PFC Krylia Sovetov Samara players
FC Novokuznetsk players
Crimean Premier League players
FC Zenit-2 Saint Petersburg players
FC Volga Ulyanovsk players